Trace Balla is an Australian children's author and illustrator. 

Rivertime won the 2015 Readings Children's Book Prize and the Wilderness Society Picture Book Award in the same year. It was shortlisted for both the 2015 Patricia Wrightson Prize for Children’s Literature, NSW Premier's Literary Awards and the 2016 WA Premier’s Book Awards.

Rockhopping, was awarded Book of the Year: Young Readers by the Children's Book Council of Australia in 2017. It was shortlisted for the Children's Award in the 2018 Adelaide Awards Festival for Literature.

The Thank You Dish was named a Notable book in the early childhood section by the Children’s Book Council of Australia in 2018.

Landing with Wings, was shortlisted for the 2020 Speech Pathology Australia Book of the Year Award for books for eight to ten year olds.

The Heart of the Bubble is her most recent work, its graphic novel set during the coronavirus pandemic about a family’s awakening to what really matters. 

She lives in Castlemaine, Victoria.

Works 

 Rivertime, 2014, 
 Shine: A story about saying goodbye, 2015, 
 Rockhopping, 2016, 
 The Thank You Dish, 2017, 
 Landing with Wings, 2020, 
The Heart of the Bubble, 2020,

References 

Living people
Year of birth missing (living people)
Australian children's writers
21st-century Australian women writers
21st-century Australian writers